The 50th Tour of Flanders cycling classic was held on Saturday, 9 April 1966. The race was won by Belgian rider Edward Sels in a sprint before Italian Adriano Durante. 60 of 151 riders finished.

Route
The race started in Ghent and finished in Gentbrugge – covering 243 km. For the first time since the 1940s the Kwaremont climbs was not addressed because of road works. There were six categorized climbs:

Results

References

External links
 Video of the 1966 Tour of Flanders on Sporza (in Dutch)

Tour of Flanders
1966 in road cycling
1966 in Belgian sport
1966 Super Prestige Pernod